John Kellogg may refer to:

 John Kellogg (actor) (1916–2000), American actor in film, stage and television
 John Kellogg (Ohio politician), former member of the Ohio House of Representatives
 John Azor Kellogg (1828–1883), American military leader and politician from Wisconsin
 John Harvey Kellogg (1852–1943), American physician who ran a sanitarium using holistic methods in Battle Creek, Michigan
 J. A. Kellogg (1871-1962), Washington politician